Mark Gracer P. Isip (born December 10, 1980 ) is a Filipino professional basketball coach and former player. Isip played college basketball for the FEU Tamaraws, where he is currently an assistant coach. He was then drafted sixth overall by the Sta. Lucia Realtors in the 2006 PBA draft and played ten seasons in the Philippine Basketball Association (PBA).

Isip only played limited minutes in his first few years until he played for the Barako Bull Energy Boosters during most of the 2010–11 PBA Philippine Cup where he had a number of double-double performances. In 2014, he was traded to GlobalPort for Jondan Salvador.

Isip also played in the Maharlika Pilipinas Basketball League (MPBL) for the Makati Skyscrapers (later the Makati Super Crunch).

PBA career statistics

Correct as of September 23, 2016

Season-by-season averages
 
|-
| align=left | 
| align=left | Sta. Lucia
| 45 ||	12.7 || .493 || .000 || .609 || 2.4 ||	.2 ||	.2 ||	.1 ||	3.8
|-
| align=left | 
| align=left | Coca-Cola / Welcoat
| 35 ||	10.5 	 || .431 || .000 || .632 || 2.4 ||	.2 ||	.1 ||	.1 ||	3.0
|-
| align=left | 
| align=left | Rain or Shine
| 46 ||	15.2 || .490 || .091 || .741 || 3.5 ||	.3 ||	.0 ||	.1 ||	6.4
|-
| align=left | 
| align=left | Talk N' Text / Barako Bull
| 18 ||	10.1 || .500 || .000 || .750 || 2.2 ||	.4 ||	.2 ||	.1 ||	5.1
|-
| align=left | 
| align=left | Barako Bull / Meralco
| 32 ||	24.3 || .450 || .000 || .699 || 5.6 ||	.6 ||	.3 ||	.1 ||	11.5
|-
| align=left | 
| align=left | Meralco
| 34 ||	20.9 || .462 || .000 || .682 || 4.2 ||	.6 ||	.2 ||	.2 ||	7.3
|-
| align=left | 
| align=left | Air21
| 38 ||	21.7 || .466 || .143 || .780 || 4.1 ||	.8 ||	.1 ||	.2 ||	8.1
|-
| align=left | 
| align=left | Barako Bull
| 24 ||	15.3 || .386 || .000 || .800 || 3.0 ||	.5 ||	.2 ||	.2 ||	5.3
|-
| align=left | 
| align=left | GlobalPort
| 34 ||	17.0 || .407 || .333 || .780 || 4.1 ||	.2 ||	.2 ||	.1 ||	5.3
|-
| align=left | 
| align=left | GlobalPort
| 8 ||	7.9 || .500 || .500 || .000 || 1.3 ||	.3 ||	.0 ||	.0 ||	2.8
|-class="sortbottom"
| align=center colspan=2 | Career
| 314 || 16.4 || .456 || .194 || .720 || 3.5 ||	.4 ||	.2 ||	.1 ||	6.1

References

External links
 Player Profile
 PBA-Online! Profile
 News at pba.ph

1980 births
Living people
Filipino men's basketball players
Rain or Shine Elasto Painters players
FEU Tamaraws basketball players
Basketball players from Manila
Small forwards
Power forwards (basketball)
Powerade Tigers players
TNT Tropang Giga players
Barako Bull Energy Boosters players
Meralco Bolts players
Air21 Express players
San Miguel Beermen players
Barako Bull Energy players
NorthPort Batang Pier players
Maharlika Pilipinas Basketball League players
Sta. Lucia Realtors draft picks
FEU Tamaraws basketball coaches
Filipino men's basketball coaches